"Flap Your Wings" is a single by the hip hop artist Nelly, released on July 3, 2004, from the album Sweat. It was released as a double A-side with "My Place" in the UK and New Zealand.

Music video
The music video starts off with Nelly in a car with rapper Ali, singing along to "Down In Da Water". He arrives at a cave, and walks through, as the music starts to play. It continues with Nelly rapping, and many girls dancing around him. As the music video comes to an end, it shows the scene at exactly the start of the video for "My Place".

Charts

Weekly charts

Year-end charts

Release history

References

2006 singles
Nelly songs
UK Singles Chart number-one singles
Number-one singles in Australia
Song recordings produced by the Neptunes
Songs written by Chad Hugo
Songs written by Pharrell Williams
Songs written by Nelly
Universal Records singles
2004 songs